The 2016 Rhythmic Gymnastics European Championships was the 32nd edition of the Rhythmic Gymnastics European Championships, which took place on 17–19 June 2016 in Holon, Israel.

Participating countries

Schedule
 Friday, June 17
09:30-11:30 Juniors, group A - rope + hoop
11:50-14:10 Juniors, group B - rope + hoop
14:25-16:45 Juniors, group C - rope + hoop
17:30-17:55 Opening Ceremony
18:00 – 20:35 Senior groups-alternating 5 ribbons / 6 clubs & 2 hoops
 Saturday, June 18
09:00-11:20 Juniors, group B - ball + clubs
11:45-14:05 Juniors, group C - ball + clubs
14:20 – 16:40 Juniors, group A - ball + clubs
16:40 – 16:55 Award ceremony – Juniors Team
17:00 – 19:00 Seniors Group B
19:00 – 21:05 Seniors Group A
Award ceremony – Seniors
 Sunday, June 19
13:00-13:50 Juniors Finals (rope & hoop)
13:50-14:05 Award Ceremony (rope & hoop)
14:05-14:55 Juniors Finals (ball & clubs)
14:55-15:10 Award Ceremony (ball & clubs)
16:15 – 16:55 Senior Groups Finals - 5 Ribbons
16:57-18:00 Senior groups Finals – 6 clubs & 2 hoops
Award Ceremony (groups 5 ribbons, 6 clubs & 2 hoops)
18:30 Gala + Closing Ceremony

Medal winners

Results

Seniors

Individual all-around

Group all-around

Group 5 Ribbons

Group 6 Clubs + 2 Hoops

Juniors

Team

Rope

Hoop

Ball

Clubs

Medal count

References

External links
 Official site
 Starlists
Rhythmic Gymnastics Results
Longines Timing

Rhythmic Gymnastics European Championships
European Rhythmic Gymnastics Championships
Sport in Holon
International sports competitions hosted by Israel
2016 in Israeli sport
Gymnastics competitions in Israel